Mauricio Prieto full name Mauricio Prieto Garcés (born September 26, 1987 in Montevideo, Uruguay) is a Uruguayan footballer. He currently plays for Racing Club de Montevideo.

International career

Under-20
Prieto was part of Uruguay's 2007 FIFA U-20 World Cup squad, playing two matches.

Under-22
In 2011, he was named to participate in the Uruguay national football team under-22 squad for the 2011 Pan American Games.

References

External links

1987 births
Living people
Uruguayan footballers
Uruguay under-20 international footballers
Uruguayan expatriate footballers
Association football defenders
Club Atlético River Plate (Montevideo) players
Club Bolívar players
Santiago Wanderers footballers
FC Kuban Krasnodar players
Deportes Temuco footballers
Racing Club de Montevideo players
Chilean Primera División players
Bolivian Primera División players
Uruguayan Primera División players
Uruguayan Segunda División players
Footballers at the 2011 Pan American Games
Pan American Games medalists in football
Pan American Games bronze medalists for Uruguay
Medalists at the 2011 Pan American Games
Uruguayan expatriate sportspeople in Chile
Uruguayan expatriate sportspeople in Bolivia
Uruguayan expatriate sportspeople in Russia
Expatriate footballers in Chile
Expatriate footballers in Bolivia
Expatriate footballers in Russia